Rustai-ye Choghuki (also Romanized as Rūstāī-ye Choghūkī; also known as Choghūkī) is a village in Qaleh Rural District, in the Central District of Manujan County, Kerman Province, Iran. At the 2006 census, its population was 948, in 176 families.

References 

Populated places in Manujan County